is a railway station on the northern Ōu Main Line in the city of Aomori, Aomori Prefecture, Japan, operated by East Japan Railway Company (JR East).

Lines

Station layout
The station  has two opposed side platforms , connected to the station building by a footbridge. The station is unattended.

Platforms

History
Tsurugasaka Station was opened on November 15, 1929 as the Tsurugasaka Signal. It was upgraded to a station on the Japanese Government Railways (JGR), the pre-war predecessor to Japanese National Railways (JNR) on January 20, 1933. With the privatization of JNR on April 1, 1987, the station came under the operational control of JR East. A new station building was completed in July 2007.

Surrounding area
Tarapoki onsen

Bus services

Aomori Municipal Bus
For Aomori Station via Shinjō and Furukawa
For Namioka Station via Daishaka
For Magonai
Konan Bus
For Kuroishi via Namioka and Tobinai
For Gosyogawara via Daishaka and Harako
For Yadame via Shinjō, Aomori Station and Shinmachi

See also
 List of railway stations in Japan

External links

   

Stations of East Japan Railway Company
Railway stations in Aomori Prefecture
Ōu Main Line
Railway stations in Japan opened in 1933
Aomori (city)